Glinde is a town in Germany in southern Schleswig-Holstein, approximately 7 km east of Hamburg.

History
The name Glinde was first mentioned in a document dated from March 25, 1229. In the document Graf Adolf IV. of Schauenburg and Holstein gave the village to a Cistercian convent. (The monastery was later moved to the location of the modern town Reinbek). The King of Denmark and Duke of Schleswig-Holstein, Frederick I of Denmark, took possession of the monastery during the Protestant Reformation. 1544 his son Christian III shared it with his brothers. The affiliation changed several times.

1948, the municipalities Glinde, Oststeinbek, Havighorst and Schönningstedt were amalgamated to the Amt Glinde. After Schönningstedt and subsequently (1949) Havighorst left the association, Glinde and Oststeinbek became independent municipalities in 1978.

On June 24, 1979 (the 750th anniversary of the village), Glinde received its town charter.

Mayors
-2009:Uwe Rheders
2009-:Rainhard Zug

Literature
 Wolfgang Bachhofer: Glinde. 1929 bis 1979. Eine junge Stadt stellt sich vor. Glinde 1979.

References

External links
 www.glinde.de (official website

Towns in Schleswig-Holstein
Stormarn (district)